Erappungal Abubacker (born 31 May 1952) is an Indian politician.

Founder President of Social Democratic Party of India (SDPI), Founder Chairman of National Development Front (NDF),
Chairman, Popular Front of India (2007, 2017 & National executive council member present); Founder Chairman of Rehab india foundation ;Secretary, All India Milli Council (2005);
State President, Students Islamic Movement of India (1982); founder Member of All India Muslim Personal Law Board; Managing Editor, Thejas Daily News Paper (2006), Editor, India Next Hindi Magazine.

References

1952 births
Living people
Malayali politicians
Indian newspaper editors
People from Kozhikode district
20th-century Indian journalists
Indian male journalists
21st-century Indian Muslims